Islam in Tanzania is the second largest religion in the country behind Christianity. According to a 2020 estimate by Pew research center, Muslims represent 34.1% of the total population. The faith was introduced by merchants visiting the Swahili coast, as it became connected to a larger maritime trade network dominated by Muslims. This would lead to local conversions and assimilations of foreign Muslims, ultimately causing the eventual formation of several officially Muslim political entities in the region.

On the mainland, Muslim communities are concentrated in coastal areas, with some large Muslim majorities also in inland urban areas especially and along the former caravan routes. More than 99% of the population of the Zanzibar archipelago is Muslim. The largest group of Muslims in Tanzania are Sunni Muslim, with significant Shia and Ahmadi minorities. According to the Pew Research Center research conducted in 2008 and 2009, 40% of the Muslim population of Tanzania identifies as Sunni,  20% as Shia, and 15% as Ahmadi, besides a smaller subset of Ibadism practitioners as well as non-denominational Muslims.

History

The earliest evidence of a Muslim presence in the African Great Lakes is the foundation of a mosque in Shanga on Pate Island, where gold, silver and copper coins dating from 830 were found during an excavation in the 1980s. The oldest functioning mosque is the Kizimkazi mosque which dates back to the 11th or early 12th century.

The political history of Islam in the country can be traced to the establishment of the Kilwa Sultanate in the 10th century by Ali ibn al-Hassan Shirazi, a Persian prince of Shiraz. Islam was mainly spread through trade activity along the East African coast and by the 16th century, Islam was firmly established in the region.

Around the 19th century, trading routes between the Tanzanian interior and the Swahili coast intensified the influence of Swahili culture and religion. Despite the importance of trade, the spread of Islam in the interior was mainly facilitated by Sufi missionaries, converted locals returning from the coast, and Muslim chiefs during the colonial period.

Sufi orders like the Qadiriyya and Shadhiliyya propagated throughout the 19th and early 20th centuries, further consolidating Islam in the interior. During the struggle for Tanzanian independence in the mid-20th century, the Muslims of the nation supported the movement.

See also
 Religion in Tanzania
 Islam in Zanzibar

References

External links
 Islamic family law in Tanzania

 
Tanzania